Carswell is an impact crater within the Athabasca Basin of the Canadian Shield in northern Saskatchewan, Canada. The crater is exposed at the surface.

Access
The Carswell Crater can be reached by Saskatchewan Highway 955. The  gravel road begins in the village of La Loche and ends at the old Cluff Lake mine site within the crater. The Cluff Lake uranium mine produced over 62 million pounds of yellowcake during its 22-year operating life. Since the mine is now closed and decommissioned, there are no travel services in the vicinity and no functional airstrip. Motorists driving to the crater need to carry sufficient fuel and supplies for the round trip back to La Loche.

See also 
 Geology of Saskatchewan

References

External links
Aerial exploration of the Carswell impact structure

Impact craters of Saskatchewan
Cretaceous impact craters
Division No. 18, Saskatchewan